Muirkirk railway station was a railway station serving the village of Muirkirk, East Ayrshire, Scotland.

First station
The (GPK&AR) and the Glasgow, Dumfries and Carlisle Railway amalgamated on 28 October 1850 and the station then became part of the Glasgow and South Western Railway (G&SWR).

Early times
Initially the station was a very modest affair, the station building was positioned alongside a level crossing over Furnace Road, the single track line continued on to service some lime kilns. Slightly to the north of the crossing two lines ran into Muirkirk Ironworks the main source of freight in the area. The station probably only had one platform between the main running line and the goods yard situated to the south, there was a passing loop on the opposite side to allow locomotives to run around trains. The goods yard had a warehouse with two sidings connected with wagon turntables, there was also a two road engine shed with a turntable.

Services
On opening the station had three services from  via , leaving Glasgow at 0730, 1330 and 1830, times of arrival were not published. By March 1850 these had been reduced to two services each way, those leaving Muirkirk were at 0710 and 1610. At this time the fare to Glasgow was 8s 9d in first class and 6s 6d in second, day tickets were available at a reduction of one-fourth from the usual fares.

Joint station
The Caledonian Railway opened a line for freight from Douglas, South Lanarkshire to make an end-on connection slightly to the east of the station on 1 January 1873. The line was opened to passengers on 1 June 1874 when the station became a through station shared by both companies with the Caledonian Railway having running powers from Muirkirk Junction.

The delay in opening the Caledonian line to passengers may have been because the station facilities were inadequate, the Caledonian Railway noted this failing in September 1873, this may have been when the station was rebuilt. It was definitely rebuilt sometime before being re-sited in 1896.

A larger station building had been built and there were two platforms, one each side of the now double track, connected with a footbridge, The goods yard had been extended and the engine shed was now four track with a larger turntable.

Services
In 1895 both the Glasgow and South Western Railway and the Caledonian Railway were running services to Muirkirk. In the opposite direction there were four trains.

There was no Sunday service.

Second station
The station was re-sited about  eastward in 1896. The new station was to the east of Furnace Road and accessed by a service road to the south of the railway. There were two platforms either side of the running lines connected by a footbridge. The old station was re-used as a goods station. The goods yard was able to accommodate most types of goods including live stock, it was equipped with a three-ton crane.

Decline and closure
There was no Sunday service.

Passenger services from Auchinleck were withdrawn in 1950 and from Ayr in 1951. Services were withdrawn from Lanark, and the station closed to passengers on 5 October 1964, a casualty of the programme of closures advocated by the Beeching Report.

Freight services from Lanark closed at the same time as passenger services in 1964 but the line remained open for freight to the west until finally closing on 7 February 1969.

References

Notes

Citations

Bibliography

Further reading

External links

 

Beeching closures in Scotland
Disused railway stations in East Ayrshire
Former Glasgow and South Western Railway stations
Railway stations in Great Britain closed in 1964
Railway stations in Great Britain opened in 1848